The 2016 AFF Futsal Championship is the 13th edition of the tournament which been held from 23 January 2017 to 29 January 2017. It was initially planned to be held from 31 October to 6 November 2016.

Following the death of King Bhumibol Adulyadej, the Football Association of Thailand postponed to host the 2016 AFF Futsal Championship. Football Association of Indonesia (PSSI) offered to host 2016 AFF Futsal Championship after Thailand postponed. The event was rescheduled to 9 – 15 November 2016.

On 21 October 2016, AFF officially announced that the event will be cancelled due to the withdrawing from being the host of PSSI. AFF asked Singapore to be the new host but they were unable to operate the event in short time of the preparation.  Due to difficulties of finding new hosts for the tournament, at the 7th AFF Council Meeting held in 29 October 2016, it was decided that the tournament is to be hosted in early 2017 instead.

On 17 December 2016, AFF officially announced the new schedule of the tournament. The tournament had been held in Bangkok. Vietnam and Singapore have pulled out from the tournament due to the internal reasons.

Qualified teams
A total of seven AFF member national teams participated in the tournament. Australia, Cambodia, Singapore and Vietnam didn't participated in this tournament.

Venue

Group stage

Tiebreakers
The teams were ranked according to points (3 points for a win, 1 point for a draw, 0 points for a loss). If tied on points, tiebreakers would be applied in the following order:
 Greater number of points obtained in the group matches between the teams concerned;
 Goal difference resulting from the group matches between the teams concerned;
 Greater number of goals scored in the group matches between the teams concerned;
 If, after applying criteria 1 to 3, teams still have an equal ranking, criteria 1 to 3 are reapplied exclusively to the matches between the teams in question to determine their final rankings. If this procedure does not lead to a decision, criteria 5 to 9 apply;
 Goal difference in all the group matches;
 Greater number of goals scored in all the group matches;
 Penalty shoot-out if only two teams are involved and they are both on the field of play;
 Fewer score calculated according to the number of yellow and red cards received in the group matches (1 point for a single yellow card, 3 points for a red card as a consequence of two yellow cards, 3 points for a direct red card, 4 points for a yellow card followed by a direct red card);
 Drawing of lots.

Times listed are UTC+7.

Group A

Group B

Knockout stage

Semi-finals

Third place match

Final

Winner

Goalscorers 
8 goals
  Pyae Phyo Maung

7 goals
  Syahidansyah Lubis
  Muhammad Osamanmusa

6 goals
  Khairul Effendy
  Ridzwan Bakri
  Nyein Min Soe
  Jirawat Sornwichian
  Sorasak Phoonjungreed

5 goals
  Panat Kittipanuwong

4 goals

  Andri Kustiawan
  Abu Haniffa
  Peerapol Satsue
  Remigio Duarte Lopes da Silva

3 goals

  Ardiansyah Runtuboy
  Bambang Bayu Saptaji
  Reza Yamani
  Akmarulnizam Idris
  Muhammad Awaluddin Bin Mat Nawi
  Muhammad Azri
  Aung Aung
  Kritsada Wongkaeo
  Panya Aranpoowanart
  Tairong Petchtiam
  Jose Lopes Vide
  Manuel Sa Sarmento

2 goals

  Abdul Azim
  Ak Muhd Naqib
  Maziri Maidin
  Ardy Dwi Suwardy
  Soulichanh Phasawaeng
  Azwann Ismail
  Saiful Nizam Bin Mohd Ali
  Syed Aizad Daniel
  Aung Zin Oo
  Kaung Chit Thu
  Sai Pyone Aung
  Adriel Philbert Pereira

1 goal

  Mohammad Faiz
  Mohammad Nor Azizam
  Al Fajri Zikri
  Jaelani Ladjanibi
  Muhammad Iqbal Iskandar
  Randy Satria
  Septyan Dwi Chandra
  Khampha Phiphakkhavong
  Muhammad Awaluddin Bin Hassan
  Saiful Aula Bin Ahmad
  Khin Zaw Linn
  Naing Ye Kyaw
  Pyae Phyo Maung (2)
  Chaivat Jamgrajang
  Peerapat Kaewwilai
  Bruno Maria Gomes
  Kui Sen Mu

1 own goal

  Azwann Ismail 
  Pyae Phyo Maung (2)

References

External links
 Official website

AFF Futsal Championship
AFF 2016
International futsal competitions hosted by Thailand
2017 in Thai football
January 2017 sports events in Asia